Findlay Brown is a Yorkshire-born, Brooklyn-based singer-songwriter and producer. His music is melodic, gentle and intimate, drawing on influences from the rural settings where he grew up. His songs are metaphoric, often using nature's imagery to illustrate the inner conflict in the search for a more truthful way of living.

His debut album, Separated By the Sea, was released in 2007 on Peacefrog Records in the UK. It was produced by former Simian singer, Simon Lord. 
Dave Simpson gave the album 5/5 stars: "Brilliantly melancholic, the most unlikely classic of the year" ***** – The Guardian "Set's the benchmark for gorgeous troubadour folk" – MOJO.

Brown's second solo album Love Will Find You was released in 2010 on Verve Records, US. It was produced by ex-Suede guitarist Bernard Butler.

Slow Light Brown's third solo album release was co-produced with Danish producer Tobias Wilner (Blue Foundation), and with influences drawing from minimalist music, soundtracks, African music and classic songwriting."A kaleidoscopic, nostalgic vision." – Interview Magazine "There's a newfound breath and life in these compositions…"  – SPIN.

Collaborations and touring

Findlay Brown has toured and collaborated with: Erol Alkan, Lily Allen, Au Revoir Simone, Carl Barât, Barbarossa, Bat for Lashes, Brendan Benson, Beyond the Wizard's Sleeve, Blue Foundation, Briganté, Bernard Butler, Alberta Cross, Drivin N Cryin, Duffy, Johnny Flynn, Bert Jansch, Keane, Simon Lord, Lovefingers, Luca C, Brendan Lynch, Shelby Lynne, Passenger, Fionn Regan, John Renbourn, The Sleepy Jackson, Angus and Julia Stone, Richard Swift, Taylor Swift, and Paul Weller, and at the Warchild Benefit Concert at Brixton Academy with the Pet Shop Boys.

In 2013, Brown formed a DJing duo with Xander Ferreira which they called The Happy Show, playing host at events – both in Brooklyn, where they are based, and elsewhere – to which they brought an "African groove". In describing these events, one reviewer said the pair had "created a joyous, ritualistic, dance gathering."

Brown's concerts and touring from 2006 to 2015 included major cities throughout Europe and the US. He has performed at all the major summer festivals, including CMJ Music Marathon, the End of the Road Festival, the Glastonbury Festival, the Latitude Festival, the Reading Festival, Secret Garden Party, and SXSW.

TV and media

Findlay Brown appeared on the Late Show with David Letterman in January 2010 with a full orchestra. 
Findlay has performed several TV show appearances such as The Late Show with David Letterman, Top of the Pops and TARATATA. 
Radio support from radio hosts Zane Lowe and Jo Whiley (Radio 1) Ferne Cotton (Radio 2), John Kennedy (XFM), Rita Houston WFUV, KEXP, Deepak Chopra (Sirius Radio).

Findlay Brown has appeared in many major international media and publications, including: The Guardian, Mojo, The New York Times, Vice, The Sun, Vogue, Musicweek, The LA Times, Spin Magazine, Arena, Oprah, Uncut, Word, Drowned in Sound, Stereogum and many more.

His song "Come Home" was featured in a television advertisements for the credit card company MasterCard.

Discography

Albums

 Separated By the Sea, Peacefrog, 2007.

 Love Will Find You, Verve, 2010.

 Slow Light, Nettwerk, 2015.

 Not Everything Beautiful Is Good, Nettwerk, 2018.
 Being Young Is Getting Old, Nettwerk, 2021.

Extended plays

 Don't You Know I Love You EP (2006)

 Versus EP (2009)

 Promised Land EP (2010)

Singles

 Last Christmas (2006)
 Lean on Me (2017)

References

External links
 Official website

Living people
1976 births
21st-century British singers
21st-century British male singers
British expatriates in the United States
Peacefrog Records artists